Abu'l-Hasan ( 1569 - 12 June 1641) entitled by the Mughal emperor Jahangir as Asaf Khan, was the Grand Vizier (Prime minister) of the fifth Mughal emperor Shah Jahan. He previously served as the vakil (the highest Mughal administrative office) of Jahangir. Asaf Khan is perhaps best known for being the father of Arjumand Banu Begum (better known by her title Mumtaz Mahal), the chief consort of Shah Jahan and the older brother of Empress Nur Jahan, the chief consort of Jahangir.

Family
Asaf Khan was the son of the Persian noble Mirza Ghias Beg (popularly known by his title of Itimad-ud-Daulah),  who served as the Prime minister of the Mughal emperor Jahangir. Ghiyas Beg was a native of Tehran, and was the youngest son of Khvajeh Mohammad-Sharif, a poet and vizier of Mohammad Khan Tekkelu and his son Tatar Soltan, who was the governor of the Safavid province of Khorasan. Asaf Khan's mother, Asmat Begam, was the daughter of Mirza Ala-ud-Daula Aqa Mulla.

Both of Asaf Khan's parents were descendants of illustrious families – Ghias Beg from Muhammad Sharif and Asmat Begam from the Aqa Mulla clan. Asaf Khan's family had come to India impoverished in 1577, when his father, Mirza Ghias Beg, was taken into the service of Emperor Akbar in Agra.

Marriage
In his prime youth, Asaf Khan was married to Diwanji Begum, the daughter of a Persian noble, Khwaja Ghias-ud-din of Qazvin, also entitled Asaf Khan (II). The couple had at least ten children together: three sons, Shaista Khan, Mirza Bahmanyar, and Farrukh Fal, and seven daughters, Arjumand Banu Begum (later known as Mumtaz Mahal), Malika Banu Begum, Farzana Begum, Saliha Banu Begum, Malja Banu Begum, Mihr-un-Nissa Begum, and Najiba Banu Begum.

Arjumand was married to Jahangir's third son, Prince Khurram (later known as Shah Jahan) in 1612 and became his most beloved wife. Parwar Khanam was married to Mohtashim Khan, the son of Jahangir's foster brother Qutubuddin Koka.

Governor of Lahore 

Mirza Abul  Hasan Asaf Khan was appointed Governor of Lahore by Emperor Jahangir in 1625. After the demise of Jahangir in 1627, he was instrumental in securing the accession of his son-in-law Shah Jahan by colluding with Dawar Bakht (Jahangir's other son) and defeating the acting emperor Prince Shahryar (Nur Jahan's son-in-law, married to her daughter by her previous marriage to Sher Afgan) in a battle near Lahore. Asaf Khan enjoyed a position even more elevated than in the preceding reign and retained it until 1632, when he failed in the siege of Bijapur, from which time he seems to have lost favour.

Positions

 Grand Vizier (Wazir-e-Azam of the Mughal Empire) – (1628–41)
 Subehdar of Lahore (1625–27)
 Subehdar of Gujrat Subah (1630–39)
 Faujdar of Gagron (Malwa Subah) – (1635–41)

Death and burial place

Asaf Khan died on 12 June 1641 while engaged in fighting against the forces of rebel Raja Jagat Singh Pathania. Asaf Khan left an immense fortune, in spite of the quarter of a million sterling that his palace at Lahore cost him. His tomb was built in Shahdara Bagh, Lahore, as per Shah Jahan's orders. It lies west of the Tomb of Nur Jahan and adjacent to the Tomb of Jahangir.

See also 
Safdarjung

References

Sources

External links 

 
 History of Asaf Khan

1641 deaths
Mughal nobility
Iranian emigrants to the Mughal Empire
1569 births
17th-century Iranian politicians
16th-century Iranian politicians
Grand viziers of the Mughal Empire
Subahdars of Lahore